François-André Baudin (2 December 1774 – Strasbourg, 18 June 1842) was a French naval officer. His nephew Auguste Baudin was a colonial governor and naval officer.

Life
He took part in the Baudin expedition to Australia, led by his namesake Nicolas Baudin, leaving Le Havre on 19 October 1800. He was a lieutenant de vaisseau on board the Géographe, a vessel whose officers also included an ensign (aspirant) called Charles Baudin. François-André Baudin fell ill and was left behind on île de France in April 1801.

Under the First French Empire, François-André Baudin rose to capitaine de vaisseau, commanding a force made up of the frigate Topaze (his flagship), the corvettes Département-des-Landes (captained by Desmontils) and Torche (captained by Dehen) and the brig Faune (captained by Brunet). Topaze was also involved in the action with the Raisonnable and managed to escape to the Tagus.

In November 1809 Baudin was ordered to take the 80-gun ships of the line Robuste and Borée, the 74-gun Lion and the frigates Pauline and Pomone and escort a twenty ship convoy from Toulon to Barcelona to supply the Napoleonic forces fighting the Peninsular War. This French force was met by a hugely superior British squadron under George Martin. Seeing that the enemy had gained speed and was trying to block his path, Baudin ordered his ships to make for land as fast as possible, but this only led to the Robuste and Lion going aground – to deny them to the British, Baudin ordered them set on fire and scuttled near Frontignan. Captain Senèz, commanding the Borée, stayed further offshore whilst still obeying Boudin's orders – he passed through the middle of the British squadron and escaped into the port of Sète, normally too small for ships of the line.

Titles 

 Baron de l'Empire (16 February 1810).

Coat of arms

References

External links
 Service Historique de la Marine – Fort de Vincennes – Dossier S.H.A.M. Côte : CC7 ALPHA 126.
 Côte S.H.A.M., état de services, distinctions sur web.genealogie.free.fr : Les militaires.

1774 births
1842 deaths
Burials at Père Lachaise Cemetery
French naval commanders of the Napoleonic Wars